Light Fantastic is an album by the American ambient musician Steve Roach, released in 1999.

Track listing

Personnel 
 Steve Roach – arranger, composer, producer, performer
 Stephen Hill – art direction
 Vir Unis – computer (filter and fractal groove creation infusions)
 Jeremy Hulette – design
 Bob Olhsson – mastering
Stephen Hill – mastering
 Roger King – pre-mastering

References

External links 
 Light Fantastic at Hearts of Space Records
 Light Fantastic at Discogs

1999 albums
Steve Roach (musician) albums